Mirbelia confertiflora is a species of flowering plant in the family Fabaceae and is endemic to eastern Australia. It is a rigid, bushy shrub with linear leaves and yellow to orange flowers arranged in racemes near the end of the branches.

Description
The flowers are arranged in racemes on the ends of branches or in upper leaf axils, and have narrowly lance-shaped bracts and bracteoles at the base.

Taxonomy
Mirbelia confertiflora was first formally described in 1977 by Leslie Pedley in the journal  Austrobaileya from specimens he collected at Jolly's Falls near Stanthorpe in 1963. The specific epithet (confertiflora) means "crowded-flowered".

Distribution and habitat
This mirbelia grows in forest and heath on granite and is only known from the Boonoo Boonoo National Park in Queensland and the Gibraltar Range National Park in New South Wales.

Conservation status
Mirbelia confertiflora is listed as "near threatened" under the Queensland Government Nature Conservation Act 1992.

References

Mirbelioids
confertiflora
Fabales of Australia
Flora of New South Wales
Flora of Queensland
Plants described in 1977